Fame and Fortune is a 1986 album by Bad Company.

Fame and Fortune may also refer to:

Music
 "Fame and Fortune" (Elvis Presley song), 1960
 "Fame and Fortune" (Bad Company song), 1986
 "Fame and Fortune", a song by Mission of Burma from Signals, Calls, and Marches, 1981
 Fame & Fortune?, an album by Formerly of Bucks Fizz, 2012

Other uses
 Fame and Fortune (game show), an Irish television show 1996–2006
 Fame and Fortune Weekly, an American periodical for children 1905–1929